The 2021–22 DHB-Pokal was the 45th edition of the tournament.

THW Kiel won their 13th title after defeating SC Magdeburg in the final.

Round 1
The draw was held on 20 July 2021. The matches were played from 26 to 29 August 2021. All Handball-Bundesliga teams had a bye.

Round 2
The draw was held on 4 September 2021. The matches were played between 5 and 21 October 2021. The finalists of the Amateurpokal entered this round.

Round of 16
The draw was held on 22 October 2021. The matches were played on 14, 15 and 21 December 2021.

Quarterfinals
The draw was held on 17 December 2021. The matches were played on 5 and 6 February 2022.

Final four
The draw was held on 8 February 2022. The matches were played on 23 and 24 April 2022.

Bracket

Semifinals

Final

References

External links
Official website

2021